Kniphofia thomsonii, called Thomson's red-hot poker, is a species of flowering plant in the family Asphodelaceae, native to the Great Lakes countries of Africa. Its cultivar 'Stern's Trip' has gained the Royal Horticultural Society's Award of Garden Merit.

Subtaxa

The following varieties are accepted:
Kniphofia thomsonii var. snowdenii (C.H.Wright) Marais – Kenya, Uganda
Kniphofia thomsonii var. thomsonii – Kenya, Tanzania, Democratic Republic of the Congo, Ethiopia

References

thomsonii
Flora of the Democratic Republic of the Congo
Flora of East Tropical Africa
Flora of Ethiopia
Plants described in 1885